Route 180 (locally known as McPhillips Street) is a major arterial road and city route in northwestern Winnipeg, Manitoba, Canada. It runs from Route 57 (Notre Dame Avenue) to Emes Avenue (Winnipeg city limits) near the Perimeter Highway, where it becomes Highway 8.

The route is the highest-numbered city route in Winnipeg. It serves as a connector to Highway 8 and Selkirk, Manitoba, from downtown Winnipeg via Notre Dame Ave.

Among other things, the route is home to the McPhillips Station Casino.

History
George McPhillips (1848–1913) is commemorated by McPhillips Street in Winnipeg. The street was formerly the two-mile limit of the Selkirk Settlers' lots, which started at the Red River and extended from it for four miles. The first two miles were reserved for buildings and residential pursuits. Beyond the limit was pasture land. George Jr. came from a family of land surveyors. His father, George Sr., was the first generation of the Irish-Canadian family to perform this work in Western Canada. George Sr. arrived in Manitoba in 1872 and set up a surveying business, joined by George Jr. until 1875 when he and his brothers Robert Charles McPhillips and Francis McPhillips opened an office of their own, McPhillips Brothers. The firm was active during the Winnipeg boom of 1881–82. Another brother, Albert Edward McPhillips, was a lawyer in British Columbia and Henry McPhillips was a journalist.

In 1875, Winnipeg City Council authorized George Jr. to prepare an official map of the city, the first of its kind in the West. It was a difficult task because the few existing maps of subdivisions had to be revised and brought together. The first of these maps was done in January 1872 and comprised the homestead of James Ross, whose property extended from the Red River west to Princess Street. The width of the homestead was one city block, from James Avenue to Rupert Avenue. In the course of the project, McPhillips surveyed 625 streets, measuring 290 miles. The job gave him such publicity that, in 1883, Windsor, Ontario's council asked him to prepare a map of that city. He later returned to Winnipeg. He died at his home at 168 Kennedy Street on 20 November 1913, and was buried in St. Mary's Cemetery.

Major intersections

References

180
Seven Oaks, Winnipeg